Joseph Merrick (1862–1890) was an Englishman known as "The Elephant Man" because of his physical appearance caused by a congenital defect.

Elephant Man or The Elephant Man may also refer to

People
 Gyles Mackrell (1888–1959), British tea planter known for organising elephants to rescue refugees during World War II
 Elephant Man (musician), real name O'Neil Bryan (born 1975), Jamaican musician
 Huang Chuncai (born 1977), "China's Elephant Man"

Entertainment
 The Elephant Man (play), a 1977 Broadway play by Bernard Pomerance
 The Elephant Man (film), a 1980 film directed by David Lynch
 The Elephant Man (1982 film), a 1982 television adaptation by Steve Lawson and directed by Jack Hofsiss
 Joseph Merrick, the Elephant man, an opera piece of Laurent Petitgirard
 Elephantmen, fictional characters in the comic book series of the same name, published by Image Comics
 "Elephant Man", a song by English band Suede from the 1999 album Head Music
 "Elephant Man", a song by Atlanta progressive metal band Mastodon from their 2002 album Remission